Ishoʿyahb II of Gdala was Patriarch of the Church of the East from 628 to 645.  He reigned during a period of great upheaval in the Sasanian Empire.  He became patriarch at the end of a disastrous war between Rome and Persia, which weakened both powers. Two years later the Moslem Arabs began a career of conquest in which they overthrew the Sassanian empire and occupied the eastern provinces of the Roman empire.  Ishoʿyahb lived through this momentous period, and is said to have met both the Roman emperor Heraclius and the second Moslem caliph ʿUmar ibn al-Khattab.

The Syriac name Ishoʿyahb means 'Jesus has given', and is spelled variously in English.  Alternative spellings include Yeshuyab and Ishu-yahb.  Ishoʿyahb II is commonly known as Ishoʿyahb of Gdala, to distinguish him from two near-contemporary Nestorian patriarchs, Ishoʿyahb I of Arzun (582–95) and Ishoʿyahb III of Adiabene (649–59).

Sources 
Ishoʿyahb's patriarchate, the Arab conquest of Iraq and Ishoʿyahb's dealings with the Moslem leaders are described in considerable detail in the Chronicle of Seert.  Briefer accounts are given in the Ecclesiastical Chronicle of the Jacobite writer Bar Hebraeus (thirteenth-century), and the ecclesiastical histories of the Nestorian writers Mari (twelfth-century), ʿAmr (fourteenth-century) and Sliba (fourteenth-century).

Life
Ishoʿyahb was a native of the village of Gdala in the district of Beth ʿArbaye between Nisibis and Mosul.

Ishoʿyahb studied at the School of Nisibis when it was under the presidency of the controversial theologian Hnana, who searched for common theological ground between the Nestorianism of the Church of the East and the Chalcedonian doctrines held in the Roman empire. He was one of the 300 students who left the college when Hnana was expelled. After a long vacancy in the patriarchate, he was elected patriarch of the Church of the East in 628.

In 630 Ishoʿyahb led a delegation of Persian clerics to Aleppo to discuss with the Roman emperor Heraclius the possibility of a reconciliation between the Roman and Persian Churches.  Although little is known of the content of Ishoʿyahb’s discussions with Heraclius, he evidently persuaded the emperor that, despite its traditional reverence for the teachings of Theodore of Mopsuestia, the doctrinal position of the Church of the East was orthodox.  He was asked for his views on monoenergism, the doctrine of the single energy recently espoused by the patriarchate of Constantinople, and responded with a confession of faith which was accepted by the Roman bishops.  Two masses were then celebrated, one conducted by Ishoʿyahb according to the rite used by the Church of the East, in which both Heraclius and his bishops received the eucharist from his hands, and one according to the Chalcedonian rite.  In his mass Ishoʿyahb omitted the customary references to the 'three doctors' Diodorus, Theodore and Nestorius, hoping that the Romans would avoid any mention of Cyril of Alexandria in theirs; but his conciliatory gesture was not reciprocated by the Romans.  On his return to Persia Ishoʿyahb was accused by the bishop Bar Sawma of Susa of making damaging concessions to the Romans.

Ishoʿyahb II was patriarch during the Arab conquest of Iraq, and according to later Nestorian tradition approached the Moslem leaders to win guarantees for the treatment of Christians in the Sassanian empire.  The Chronicle of Seert, probably written in the ninth century, records two approaches to the Moslems, one by Ishoʿyahb's emissaries to Muhammad's successor Abu Bakr (632–4), and a second by Ishoʿyahb himself to the caliph ʿUmar ibn al-Khattab (634–44).  ʿUmar is said to have granted the Church of the East a charter of protection.  The authenticity of these supposed approaches is very doubtful, and modern authorities are inclined to reject them.

Seleucia-Ctesiphon, the capital of the Sasanian empire and the seat of the Nestorian patriarchs at this period, fell to Saʿd b. Abi Waqqas in the spring of 637.  Saʿd carried off its gates, symbolising the rulership of central Iraq, to Kufa, and for the rest of his reign Ishoʿyahb resided at Karka d'Beth Slokh (modern Kirkuk) in Beth Garmai.

In 645 Ishoʿyahb journeyed to Nisibis to settle a dispute between the city's Nestorian Christians and their metropolitan Quriaqos. He died at Karkh Guddan and was buried there.

Literary achievement 
Ishoʿyahb II is included in the list of Syriac authors compiled by the fourteenth-century Nestorian writer ʿAbdishoʿ of Nisibis.  According to ʿAbdishoʿ, his principal writings were a commentary on the Psalms and a number of letters, histories, and homilies.  A hymn of his has survived in a Nestorian psalter (MS BM Add. 14675).

Nestorian mission to China, 635 
The first recorded Christian mission to China arrived in the Chinese capital Chang'an in 635, during Ishoʿyahb's reign.  The mission, whose history was recorded on the famous Nestorian Stele, erected in Chang'an in 781, was led by a Nestorian monk with the Chinese name A-lo-pen.  It is possible, but by no means certain, that Ishoʿyahb was behind this initiative.

See also
 List of Patriarchs of the Church of the East

Notes

References
 Abbeloos, J. B., and Lamy, T. J., Bar Hebraeus, Chronicon Ecclesiasticum (3 vols, Paris, 1877)
 Assemani, J. A., De Catholicis seu Patriarchis Chaldaeorum et Nestorianorum (Rome, 1775)
 Brooks, E. W., Eliae Metropolitae Nisibeni Opus Chronologicum (Rome, 1910)
 Gismondi, H., Maris, Amri, et Salibae: De Patriarchis Nestorianorum Commentaria I: Amri et Salibae Textus (Rome, 1896)
 Gismondi, H., Maris, Amri, et Salibae: De Patriarchis Nestorianorum Commentaria II: Maris textus arabicus et versio Latina (Rome, 1899)

 Scher, Addai (ed. and tr.). Histoire nestorienne inédite: Chronique de Séert. Première partie. Patrologia Orientalis 4.3 (1908), 5.2 (1910).
 Scher, Addai (ed. and tr.). Histoire nestorienne inédite: Chronique de Séert. Seconde partie. Patrologia Orientalis 7.2 (1911), 13.4 (1919).
 Seleznyov, Nikolai N., Heraclius and Ishōʿyahb II: An Eastern episode in the ‘ecumenical’ project of the Byzantine emperor published in: Symbol 61: Syriaca • Arabica • Iranica. Paris-Moscow, 2012, pp. 280–300.
 
 Wilmshurst, D. J., The Martyred Church: A History of the Church of the East (London, 2011)
 Wright, W., A Short History of Syriac Literature (London, 1894)

Church of the East in China
Patriarchs of the Church of the East
645 deaths
Year of birth unknown
Christians in the Sasanian Empire
Church of the East writers
Christian hymnwriters
7th-century archbishops
Christians of the Rashidun Caliphate
7th-century bishops of the Church of the East